Hurricane Gert was a large tropical cyclone that caused extensive flooding and mudslides throughout Central America and Mexico in September 1993. The seventh named storm and third hurricane of the annual hurricane season, Gert originated as a tropical depression from a tropical wave over the southwestern Caribbean Sea on September 14. The next day, the cyclone briefly attained tropical storm strength before moving ashore in Nicaragua and proceeding through Honduras. It reorganized into a tropical storm over the Gulf of Honduras on September 17, but weakened back to a depression upon crossing the Yucatán Peninsula. Once over the warm waters of the Bay of Campeche, Gert quickly strengthened into a Category 2 hurricane by September 20. The rugged terrain disrupted the cyclone's structure; Gert entered the Pacific Ocean as a depression near the state of Nayarit on September 21, where it briefly redeveloped a few strong thunderstorms before dissipating at sea five days later.

Gert's broad wind circulation produced widespread and heavy rainfall across Central America through September 15–17. Combined with saturated soil following Tropical Storm Bret's passage a month earlier, the rain triggered widespread floods and mudslides that isolated thousands of people across numerous communities. In Costa Rica, blustery weather destroyed a national park and led to significant losses in the agricultural and tourism sectors. Much of the Mosquito Coast of Nicaragua and Honduras endured overflowing rivers, engulfing cities, villages, and crops with mud and water. An increasing number of major rivers burst their banks over a period of several days, fully submerging extensive areas of land around the Pánuco basin. Tens of thousands of residents were forced to evacuate as raging floodwaters demolished scores of structures in what was described as the region's worst disaster in 40 years.

In Gert's wake, the road networks across the affected countries remained severely disrupted for extended periods of time, hampering rescue missions and relief efforts in badly flooded regions. National governments and emergency workers opened shelters and distributed food for the thousands that had lost their homes and sources of income in the storm. Throughout Central America and Mexico, Gert claimed the lives of 116 people and left 16 others missing. The disaster left swaths of private property, infrastructure, and farmland in complete ruins, amounting to damage costs of more than $170 million (1993 USD). Despite the excessive damage and catastrophic loss of life caused by the storm, the name Gert was not retired following the season, and was used again in the 1999 Atlantic hurricane season.

Meteorological history

Hurricane Gert had a complex lifespan as a large and slow-moving tropical cyclone, repeatedly interacting with nearby landmasses and other atmospheric systems. Its genesis was traced to a tropical wave—an area of low pressure oriented north to south—that moved off the African coast to the south of Dakar on September 5, 1993. The wave tracked westward across the tropical Atlantic at a rapid pace and relatively low latitudes, where its interaction with the Intertropical Convergence Zone fostered the formation of convection. On its approach to the Caribbean, the system developed a weak low-pressure center at sea level, which crossed Trinidad on September 11. Although most of the cloud field brushed over the northern coast of South America, the system survived its contact with land and emerged over the southwestern Caribbean Sea on September 13. There, owing to favorable tropospheric conditions aloft, the wave showed signs of cyclonic development, as its convection thickened into curved, well-defined bands.

From its inception onwards, the depression exhibited a rather large wind field on satellite images and radiosonde data. Its broad cloud pattern gradually coalesced, and by 0900 UTC on September 15, the NHC had determined it sufficiently strong to be upgraded to Tropical Storm Gert. Gert's interaction with land impeded additional strengthening; the storm weakened back to a tropical depression just six hours after its landfall. While the storm's center remained land-bound for nearly two days, parts of its large circulation abutted the adjacent Caribbean and Pacific waters to draw in moisture and heat. As such, Gert retained its status as a tropical cyclone on its journey northwestward across the terrains of Nicaragua and Honduras. In doing so, the storm consistently defied the NHC's forecasts for its imminent dissipation.

On September 17, Gert finally exited the coast, accessed the waters of the Gulf of Honduras and restrengthened to a tropical storm. Its duration over water—and with that any opportunity for additional strengthening—was curtailed by a mid- to upper-level trough over the eastern Gulf of Mexico; it turned the storm to the north-northwest and brought it over the coast of Belize the next day. Inland, Gert began to interact with a high-pressure ridge to its northwest, which nudged the storm slightly more to the west. After crossing the Yucatán Peninsula and winding down over land, Gert entered the Bay of Campeche offshore Champotón as a tropical depression late on September 18. The open tropical waters, combined with light wind shear aloft, allowed the storm's convection to deepen and reconsolidate. At 0600 UTC the next day, Gert once more restrengthened into a tropical storm. The storm veered toward the west and slowed slightly in response to a shortwave trough to its north, granting it more time to mature over water.

At about 2100 UTC on September 20, Gert made its final landfall at peak intensity on the coast of Mexico, just north of Tuxpan, Veracruz. The hurricane accelerated and weakened quickly over the rugged mountains of the Sierra Madre Oriental, deteriorating into a tropical depression by September 21. Despite its declining strength, the large circulation again remained intact as it crossed the country. Gert entered the Pacific Ocean off the coast of Nayarit later that day, where the NHC reclassified it as Tropical Depression Fourteen-E. What remained of the deep convection waxed and waned in intensity; satellite estimates show the depression may have briefly regained tropical storm strength on September 22. It proceeded on a west to west-northwestward track with sparse thunderstorms for two days. Once the last of this convection diminished, the shallow cyclone was swept up by low-level flow. Steered farther and farther southwest, the depression encountered increasingly cool ocean temperatures. With any chance at redevelopment thwarted, the system dissipated at sea on September 26.

Preparations
After confirming the development of a tropical depression, authorities in Costa Rica issued a green alert for coastal regions on September 14. The following day, a tropical storm warning was issued for the Atlantic coast of the country. National television and radio stations broadcast warning messages to the public, and emergency crews were dispatched in case conditions were to warrant intervention. This helped with the effective and timely clearing of hospitals, as well as the evacuation of residents in high-risk zones. A tropical storm warning was posted for the Atlantic coast of Nicaragua on September 15, extending south from Puerto Cabezas to the adjacent islands. In Honduras, early storm warnings allowed several hundred residents to evacuate well ahead of Gert's arrival. Once it became evident that the storm would strike the Yucatán Peninsula, coastal areas from Belize northward to Cozumel, Mexico, were placed under a tropical storm warning on September 17 until Gert's landfall the next day.

While Gert was still located over the peninsula, the government of Mexico issued a tropical storm watch for the Gulf Coast from the city of Veracruz northward to Soto la Marina, Tamaulipas. By September 18, it was upgraded to a tropical storm warning and extended southward to Minatitlán, although the initial watch area was placed under a hurricane watch after Gert showed signs of strengthening. The next day, the tropical storm watch from Soto La Marina to Nautla was upgraded to a hurricane warning as it became clearer where Gert would make landfall. Prior to impact, several ports along the Gulf Coast halted their operations, and people living in risk zones were evacuated. All warnings and watches were discontinued after the hurricane moved inland.

Impact

Gert was a large tropical cyclone for most of its lifespan; it always remained close enough to the coast to restrengthen and redevelop strong thunderstorms. In consequence, the storm produced heavy rainfall over a large area, causing extensive flooding and mudslides from Central America to Mexico. The disaster resulted in at least 116 deaths and 16 missing persons; damage to roads, property, crops and vegetation surmounted $170 million.

Costa Rica

Although Gert's center remained off the coast of Costa Rica, its large circulation produced brisk winds and heavy rainfall across the country. A local weather station recorded  of rain during the storm. Geologically, the hardest-hit regions consisted of sedimentary layers with poor hydraulic conductivity and were therefore prone to soil saturation. The initial rainfall raised the levels of many rivers, exacerbating the flood threat. The imminent overflow of the Tempisque River prompted wide-scale evacuations, though the river crested gradually without major consequences. After hours of prolonged rainfall, many Pacific regions such as Quepos, Pérez Zeledón, and Osa experienced flooding and landslides, which inflicted moderate damage to roads and bridges.

Small-scale farmers of reed, maize, beans, and rice were also affected. The storm disrupted local fishing and wrecked several small boats in Quepos. High winds brought great destruction to about 65 percent of the vegetation in the Manuel Antonio National Park, vastly impacting the tourism-driven economy of Quepos. Gert left moderate property damage in its wake; it destroyed 27 homes and otherwise damaged 659, mostly because of flooding. Overall costs totaled $3.1 million, of which $1.7 million was due to the impaired infrastructure. Roughly 1,000 people sought shelter during the storm. Owing to the timely preparations in the country, only one cardiac arrest fatality was attributable to Gert when a landslide buried a home.

Nicaragua
Moving ashore in Nicaragua a month after Tropical Storm Bret's passage, Gert caused excessive rainfall over already saturated regions. Despite striking the Atlantic coast, the storm produced the largest amounts of precipitation over northern and Pacific coastal areas. The capital of Managua recorded  of rain during the event. After weakening to a depression inland, Gert continued to produce moderate gales along its path through the country.

 Off the coast near Big Corn Island, rough surf and winds destroyed nine fishing boats. Two canoes with an unknown number of occupants disappeared at sea. Gert produced significant coastal flooding on moving ashore near Bluefields and Tasbapauni, prompting about 1,000 residents and hundreds of indigenous Miskito villagers to evacuate. Farther inland, prolonged heavy rain caused numerous rivers to overflow, which led to disastrous freshwater flooding, especially in departments around Lake Nicaragua. All crops in and around the city were lost in the deluge. In the Rivas Department, the discharge from the Ochomogo River near the city of Rivas inundated several communities, while Cárdenas, a coastal community along the border with Costa Rica, endured several days of flooding rains. Damage in the departments of Chontales and Boaco was considerable; floods in Boaco killed five people and affected 6,000 others. The affected regions endured widespread disruptions in transportation as landslides moved onto bridges and roads; in Granada city, the isolation caused sanitation issues and led to the death of a pregnant woman who could not be transported to the hospital.

In total, Gert destroyed 252 houses and damaged another 293 across 14 of Nicaragua's departments; the storm was also responsible for considerable infrastructural damage and economic losses. As many as 123,000 people were affected throughout the country, and there were 37 confirmed fatalities. The impact on the ecology was profound: rivers, estuaries, and mangroves in and around lakes Nicaragua and Managua, as well as the inhabiting fauna, suffered from severe erosion and siltation. Since flooding from Tropical Storm Bret had occurred just one month earlier, an exclusive damage estimate for Gert is unavailable. The two storms inflicted a combined $10.7 million in damage, primarily to private property.

Honduras

Although it had weakened to a depression, Gert continued to drop significant rainfall while crossing Honduras. In Tegucigalpa, at least  of rain were recorded. Damaging floods swept through 13 of the country's 18 departments; however, northern Honduras and the Mosquitia Region, which had already endured the onslaught of Tropical Storm Bret in the previous month, bore the brunt of the devastation. The additional flooding from Gert affected 24,000 people in the region and made communication with surrounding areas nearly impossible. Elsewhere, the rain filled several major rivers, including the Ulúa; many rivers across the Sula Valley had their banks destroyed, flooding much of San Pedro Sula—the country's second-largest city—and adjacent municipalities in the Cortés Department. The rising water prompted many residents to evacuate, and the Ramón Villeda Morales International Airport halted all of its operations. The storm devastated Puerto Cortés, one of the most important port cities in Central America. Elsewhere in the Cortés Department, a river in Choloma overflowed and triggered widespread flooding; landslides in that area claimed the lives of six people.

In all, Gert wrought $10 million worth of damage to roads, bridges, and property. The disaster affected 67,447 people, of which roughly 60 percent had to evacuate from their homes. In its final public statement, the government of Honduras confirmed 27 deaths, though 12 missing persons remained unaccounted for.

Elsewhere in Central America
While passing through Central America, Gert generated an increase in cloudiness and showers across El Salvador, with a maximum  of rain recorded. Strong winds uprooted trees or snapped their limbs, damaging power lines and knocking out power. In one community, mudslides destroyed a major highway. Several other areas faced significant losses from the flooding, including San Marcos and San Vicente; some property and road damage occurred in San Miguel. Although fishing operations were suspended at the height the storm, four Salvadorean fishermen disappeared at sea. Overall, Gert affected nearly 8,000 residents and destroyed twelve homes in El Salvador; officials there confirmed five drowning deaths related to the storm.

In Guatemala, torrential rains from Gert affected approximately 20,000 people and killed one girl. The agricultural sector in the country suffered substantial losses from the flooding, though there were no specific reports of material damage. Gert moved ashore near Belize City as a minimal tropical storm, dropping rainfall in coastal areas. Just offshore, a weather station on Hunting Caye recorded  during the event. Despite the rain, only minor flooding occurred in Belize City.

Mexico
Gusty winds briefly buffeted the coast during the storm's landfall, with a maximum wind speed of  recorded in Chetumal. The effects of the storm were limited to localized floods, however, which cut off one road to traffic and forced the inhabitants from low-lying areas in Chetumal and Felipe Carrillo Puerto to evacuate to higher ground. Scattered showers also caused light flooding in parts of the state of Campeche, including Ciudad del Carmen.

Upon Gert's final landfall, high gales and waves battered wide stretches of coastline in the states of Tamaulipas and Veracruz, though hurricane-force winds were largely confined to areas within the cyclone's southern eyewall. To the north, winds reached  in Tampico, Tamaulipas. Despite the severity of the winds, the worst of Gert was due to orographic lift when its broad circulation interacted with the eastern side of the Sierra Madre Oriental, generating extreme precipitation over much of the Huasteca region.

The first signs of damage were from high winds on September 20, which uprooted trees and tore off residential roofs in Tuxpan, Naranjos, Cerro Azul, and Poza Rica. Following Gert's extreme rains, catastrophic flooding struck Mexico's Huasteca region over a period of several days, as many of its rivers rose to critical levels. In Veracruz, the imminent overflow of the Tempoal, Moctezuma, and Calabozo rivers forced thousands of residents from the municipalities of Tempoal, El Higo, and Platón Sánchez to leave their homes. The Calabozo River eventually topped its banks, cutting the village of Platón Sánchez off from the outside world. By far the most devastating, however, was the overflow of the Pánuco River on September 24, which runs from the Valley of Mexico through the municipality of Pánuco and empties in the gulf. Rushing water swept through 30 of Veracruz's 212 municipalities, completely submerging more than 5,000 homes. El Higo bore the brunt of the flooding, with 90 percent of its residential area left under water.

Once again exceeding its banks, the river destroyed a major levee in city of Pánuco, forcing 8,000 residents to evacuate. Disastrous flooding reached as far north as southern Tamaulipas, where 5,000 people had to seek refuge. Half of Tampico was coated in deep layers of mud, with scores of structures demolished. The urban areas of Madero and Altamira were also hit by the deluge. Roughly  of land around the Pánuco basin and Tampico were under water, including vast amounts of citrus, coffee, corn, maiz, bean, grain, and soy crops. Telephone, water, and electricity services throughout the region were severely disrupted, and numerous communities were isolated due to broken bridges and roads. In San Luis Potosí, water damage to schools, bridges, and roads was particularly widespread. The agricultural sector suffered heavy losses when the flooding washed away large amounts of livestock and roughly 80 percent of its crops. Throughout the state, 55,000 residents were affected by the storm, and 25 people lost their lives. Gert's trail of destruction extended as far inland as Hidalgo, where 35 rivers overtopped their banks. Floods and mudslides destroyed 38 bridges and 86 roads, as well cutting off power, telephone, and water services, disrupting communication in 361 localities. Property damage in Hidalgo was significant; 4,425 homes, 121 schools, and 49 public buildings were compromised across 35 municipalities. About  of farmland were destroyed in the storm. Fifteen deaths occurred in the state, and eight people sustained injuries.

Overall, Gert became the worst natural disaster to strike the region in 40 years; it displaced 203,500 people—many in need of shelter—and left 29,075 houses damaged or destroyed across Mexico. Material damage totaled $156 million, and the death toll stood at 45.

Aftermath

Central America
Because of the storm's impact on the country, the government of Costa Rica declared a national emergency on September 16, 1993. Emergency crews were dispatched to assess the damage and distribute life supplies to the affected population, including  of food, 1,422 mattresses, and 1,350 blankets. With much of the road network left disrupted across the affected regions, the country's agriculture, tourism, and commerce suffered considerable losses. In particular, the obstruction of the major Pan-American Highway, which connects the central region to the south of the country, had a discernible impact on the local economy. Following the expansive flooding of farmland, many independent crop producers were unable to partake in subsequent sowings.

Prior to Gert, a state of emergency had been in effect for Nicaragua as a result of Tropical Storm Bret. National and regional aid agencies, including the Red Cross, accordingly extended their relief efforts with the passage of Gert. Following the widespread muddy floods, many rural areas along the coast where the storm made landfall necessitated purification of their water wells and reconstruction of those that had been destroyed.  Although the government did not reappeal for international assistance, several cash donations were made by overseas organizations through a transfer channel at the Swiss Bank Corporation. The United Nations Development Programme provided $50,000 for the purchase of fuel, and UNICEF distributed $25,000 worth of household supplies and medicine. The World Food Programme donated 160,000 lbs (72 tonnes) of food supplies and offered disaster expert services. The federal governments of Japan, Canada, Switzerland, Norway, Germany, and Spain donated a combined $300,000 in aid.

On September 18, the President of Honduras declared a state of emergency for several municipalities after surveying the affected regions by helicopter. The governments of Japan, Canada, Germany, and the United Kingdom provided a combined $310,300 for the purchase of relief items. Although most storm victims received aid within a few days, the deteriorated road network caused a large delay in relief efforts to the hard-hit Mosquitia region. Sewage systems and waterworks countrywide were in serious need of restoration. With the destruction of its sole water reservoir, much of Puerto Cortés endured potable water shortages for months in Gert's wake. Public health concerns rose in the wake of Gert, with the cost of required medicines pinned at $208,000. A contamination of the water supplies in rural areas exacerbated a cholera outbreak. By September 28, about 27,000 residents unable to reenter their flooded homes remained in government shelters. Seven weeks later, a temporary housing project was implemented for the 120 families most in need. Approximately 5,900 families across Honduras lost their source of income due to the storm.

Mexico

In response to the flood disaster, the Red Cross immediately began distributing aid to victims across the Huasteca region. After assessing the situation by helicopter, the President of Mexico declared the Pánuco river basin an emergency zone and ordered search and rescue missions. Many homes sustained irreparable damage to their roofs, leaving tens of thousands homeless. The government appealed for international aid, seeking clothes, food, and medical supplies. Five storage centers in Hidalgo provided more than 93 million lbs (42,000 tonnes) of food supplies. Throughout San Luis Potosí,  of chicken, 45,000 pantries, and 76,000 disposable plates were distributed, as well as 50,440 blankets and 6,081 airbeds. Several schools served as shelters for the homeless; the sheltered elderly, children, and pregnant or nursing women received $27,000 worth of milk powder donations.

In the wake of Gert, the amount of respiratory disease and skin infection cases rose slightly, although the overall health situation for the country remained well under control. By two weeks after the hurricane, over 65,000 people across the region had been accommodated in shelters; most stayed there until the floods receded, although many who returned home a month later continued to rely on relief provisions. A grant of $22,000 was made available for the purchase of roofing sheets for those in urgent need of home repair. The president approved $37.4 million to commence reconstruction of roads and houses and to assist farmers throughout the region.

See also

 List of Category 2 Atlantic hurricanes
 List of Atlantic–Pacific crossover hurricanes
 Hurricane Diana (1990)
 Tropical Storm Arlene (1993)
 Tropical Storm Bret (1993)

Notes

References

External links
 The NHC's Storm Wallet Archive for Hurricane Gert
 The NHC's reports on Hurricane Gert and Tropical Depression Fourteen-E
 The WPC's rainfall report on Hurricane Gert and Tropical Depression Fourteen-E
 The 1993 Monthly Weather Review

1993 Atlantic hurricane season
Hurricane Gert
Atlantic hurricanes in Mexico
Category 2 Atlantic hurricanes
Eastern Pacific tropical depressions
Hurricanes in Belize
Hurricanes in Costa Rica
Hurricanes in El Salvador
Hurricanes in Honduras
Hurricanes in Nicaragua
September 1993 events